Fr.  Peadar Livingstone (1932 – 8 December 1987) was a Roman Catholic priest in the Diocese of Clogher, Ireland.

Early life and education
Peadar Livingstone was born in 1932 and raised in Castleblayney, County Monaghan. His father was a jeweller. He entered St. Macartan's College, Monaghan, in 1945. Following his secondary school education, he entered Maynooth College to study for the priesthood for the diocese. He studied Celtic languages — Irish and Welsh.  He then completed a second degree in theology.  He was ordained a priest in 1957.  Fr. Livingstone continued his studies at Maynooth; however, he was recalled to the diocese in 1957 before he completed his Higher Diploma in Education.

Teaching career
He was appointed to the teaching staff of St. Michael's College in Enniskillen, a diocesan seminary in County Fermanagh.  At St. Michael's, he taught Irish, history and religious education.

Fr. Livingstone was a renowned scholar in both the Irish language and local history.  In 1969, he published The Fermanagh Story, a comprehensive history of the county of Fermanagh.  In 1979, his work The Monaghan Story was published. He also wrote a regular column for The Fermanagh Herald, a local newspaper, under the name "Ernesense."

In 1977, Fr. Livingstone was appointed president of St. Michael's College where he introduced some disciplinary measures, including mandatory uniforms.

Parish Ministry
He was appointed a curate to the parish of Donaghmoyne in 1977.  In 1987, he was assigned to the parish of Clogher in County Tyrone where he died suddenly that year.

References

External links
 Father Peadar Livingstone: Ildánach, The Clogher Record, Vol. 10, No. 3 (1981), pp. 279–283 (article consists of 6 pages), published by the Clogher Historical Society
 http://www.peterspioneers.com/fermanaghstory.pdf
 
 
 

1932 births
1987 deaths
Irish educators
20th-century Irish historians
Irish writers
20th-century Irish Roman Catholic priests
Alumni of St Patrick's College, Maynooth
People from County Fermanagh
People from County Tyrone
People from County Monaghan
Date of birth missing
Date of death missing